Gay Republicans is a 2004 television documentary film directed by Wash Westmoreland that focuses on four Log Cabin Republicans as they struggle with President George W. Bush's unequivocal opposition to gay marriage and are forced to make a choice: Whether to be good Republicans and support the President, or stand up for their civil rights as gay Americans. This decision afforded them a historic opportunity to affect the 2004 presidential election, but it also opens schisms that threatens the unity of the Log Cabin itself.

Plot

The documentary looks at the lives and opinions of several gay members of the US Republican Party, including:

 Maurice Bonamigo, a Palm Beach hairstylist who was a strong supporter of George W. Bush and his policies;
 Carol Newman, an attorney from Los Angeles who has proposed to her life partner; 
 Steve May, a former state legislator who comments on perceived changes to the party over time; and
 Mark Harris, a gay rights activist with strong opinions on both sides of the debate.

Cast

 Maurice Bonamigo - as himself
 Terry Hamilton - as himself
 Mark Harris - as himself
 Steve May - as himself
 Carol Newman - as herself
 Carla Halbrook - as herself

Critical reception

The Advocate described the documentary as "fairly straightforward - and often funny" but noted that "for all the fascinating characters rushing across the screen, the film never digs deeper than its occasionally shocking surface." In its review, Variety looked at the politics of the participants and said "without seemingly intending to, Westmoreland's film offers a view of how the GOP outgunned the Democrats in 2004 and marginalized all opposition within party ranks."  The Hartford Courant said that the "film shows gay Republicans have characters as diverse as any other Republicans. They range from a calm, reasonable, same-sex-married lesbian to a Bill O'Reilly clone who spews disdain and screams 'shut up' when the discussion turns against his viewpoints."

Awards
2004 Best Documentary prize at the AFI Fest

See also
 Log Cabin Republicans
 GOProud

References

External links
Republicans at World of Wonder
 

Republican Party (United States)
2004 television films
2004 films
2004 LGBT-related films
American LGBT-related films
Documentary films about LGBT topics
LGBT politics in the United States
Films directed by Wash West
2004 documentary films
2000s English-language films
2000s American films